Knud Andersen (5 January 1922 – 14 November 1997) was a Danish cyclist. He competed at the 1948 and 1952 Summer Olympics.

References

External links
 

1922 births
1997 deaths
Danish male cyclists
Olympic cyclists of Denmark
Cyclists at the 1948 Summer Olympics
Cyclists at the 1952 Summer Olympics
Cyclists from Copenhagen